Blake Ragsdale Van Leer (August 16, 1893 – January 23, 1956) was an engineer and university professor who served as the fifth president of Georgia Institute of Technology from 1944 until his death in 1956.

Early life and education
Van Leer was born in Mangum, Oklahoma to Maurice Langhorne Van Leer and Mary McKee Tarleton. After his father's death in 1897 he grew up in a Masonic Orphanage in Fort Worth, Texas from the age of 4. He graduated with honors from Purdue University in 1915 with a degree in Electrical Engineering and later an M.S. while working at the University of California, Berkeley. He received an M.S. in mechanical engineering from here in 1920. Also studied at the University of Caen in France and the University of Munich He was awarded two doctorates, one from Washington and Jefferson College and the other from Purdue. In 1924 he married Ella Lillian Wall in Berkeley, California.

Dean and officer
Van Leer was an U.S. Army officer and began his career as an engineer. During the World War I, he led engineering teams who built bridges in front of the main infantry to cross rivers and fought in 5 different battles. On one occasion his unit held an island for two days against enemy forces and several members of his unit were killed in action. From 1932 to 1937, Van Leer was a Dean at the University of Florida. In 1937 he became the Dean of the School of  Engineering at NC State University. During his tenure at both universities, numerous departments were established, and the first graduate Engineering programs were created. While at NC State he advocated for women and encouraged many to pursue engineering degrees. The first 5 women would enroll in NC State's engineering programs and become the first to graduate in 1941. One of his students was Katharine Stinson, co-founder of Society of Women Engineers and the FAA's first female engineer. While here, he was also initiated as an honorary of the NCSU chapter of Theta Tau Professional Engineering Fraternity. Around 1940, with the permission of Dean Harrelson, Van Leer gave half his time towards the North Carolina Office for Defense orders. He resigned his post as Dean in 1942 to take a military leave.
During the war, he served as a U.S. Army officer (attaining the rank of colonel), after which he returned to lead the school.

Georgia Tech
After World War II Van Leer returned to become the President of Georgia Tech. During his tenure the school admitted women for the first time. He began allowing women to enroll in night school, after a failed vote to allow women into Georgia Tech, he attempted a second try and succeeded by split decision. Faculty member Robert B. Wallace was quoted "Van Leer was a fighter who battled to the bitter end for what he believed" and nowhere would this trait serve him well in late 1955. The first step towards integration was made during support for the 1956 Sugar Bowl game. During his time in office tech also became the largest engineering institute in the South and the third largest in the US and Canada. Van Leer also had a focus on making Atlanta the "MIT of the South." throughout his career by lobbying major companies like Lockheed Corporation to expand to Atlanta. In 1946 Van Leer was appointed as a member to The United Nations Educational, Scientific and Cultural Organization who had a focus to work against racism through influential statements on race.

Van Leer might be best known for events centered around the 1956 Sugar Bowl. Van Leer who was recorded giving frequent commence speeches at the all Black Morris Brown College, stood up to Georgia governor Marvin Griffin's demand to bar Bobby Grier from participating in the 1956 Sugar Bowl game between Georgia Tech and Grier's University of Pittsburgh. Leading up to the game, Georgia governor Marvin Griffin, sent numerous telegrams to state's Board of Regents and press explaining why Georgia should not engage in racially integrated events which had blacks either as participants or in the stands. The governor also called on the "Tech boys" to be punished. Coach Bobby Dodd and students left the whole affair up to Van Leer, Griffin to battle, and the Board of Regents. Van Leer would be summoned by The Board of Regents who commended Griffin for his stand on segregation.

Van Leer was publicly quoted: 

Van Leer stuck to his statement, even receiving a standing ovation in the faculty senate and the game went on as planned. Four years after his death an overwhelming majority of the 2,741 students present voted to endorse integration of qualified applicants, regardless of race. Van Leer advocated women get into engineering later in his career as well. Today the building that houses Tech's school of Electrical and Computer Engineering bears his name.

Van Leer also founded Southern Polytechnic State University while president of Georgia Tech. The university merged into Kennesaw State University in 2015.

Van Leer died of a heart attack on January 24, 1956, at the Atlanta Veterans Hospital.

Personal life
All of Van Leer's children would graduate as engineers. Van Leer's daughter Maryly V. Peck also became an engineer and college president. His son Blake Wayne Van Leer also became a high ranked officer for the United States Navy who was also an engineer. His youngest son Samuel Van Leer graduated from Georgia Tech and was headmaster as several private schools. Sam was quoted stating his dad "could imagine a Ramblin' Wreck from Georgia Tech being anyone, he did not concern himself with race or gender, he was always progressive."

Legacy
The building that houses Georgia Tech's school of Electrical and Computer Engineering bears his name. The Van Leer society at  NC State University is named after him. Artist Julian Hoke Harris sculpted a plaque to honor his role against Governor Griffin.

See also
 History of the Georgia Institute of Technology
 List of members of the American Legion
 1956 Sugar Bowl

References

Works cited
 
 
 Lewis Ferry Moody; Fifty Years’ Progress in Hydraulics.

External links
 Van Leer family archives
 
 GIT profile from library
 Georgia Tech celebrates 50 years of women
 Official Army Register – 1956

1893 births
1956 deaths
20th-century American engineers
American civil rights activists
American Episcopalians
Burials in Oklahoma
California city council members
Male feminists
North Carolina State University faculty
People from Atlanta
People from Eastland County, Texas
People from Mangum, Oklahoma
Presidents of Georgia Tech
Purdue University alumni
Purdue University College of Engineering alumni
United States Army colonels
United States Army personnel of World War I
University and college founders
University of Florida faculty
Van Leer family